The Glasgow Scotstoun by-election of 25 October 1950 was held after the death of Conservative MP Sir Arthur Young.

The seat was very marginal, having been won at the 1950 United Kingdom general election by 239 votes Labour again fielded W. Bargh, a Glasgow school teacher, who had narrowly failed to win the seat at the general election earlier in the year. The Conservative candidate was James Hutchison, who had been the MP for Glasgow Central from 1945 until the general election.

Result of the previous general election

Result of the by-election

Outcome
Reporting the result, The Glasgow Herald stated that the outcome of the election, an increased majority for the Conservatives, suggested that the Labour Party had lost ground in Scotland since the general election. Bargh felt that the intervention by the ILP had cost him victory, a view that Gibson, the ILP candidate did not share. The Conservative majority of 1,319 exceeded the number of votes (680) received by Gibson.

An editorial in The Glasgow Herald the morning after the contest commented that Hutchison's win had been expected, but said "it would have been blow to Mr Churchill's hopes of turning Labour out at the next general election" had the Conservatives been returned without an increased majority. The same editorial said the Conservative majority had increased by a "gratifying number of votes" and attributed this to Hutchinson having been known to have had a previously successful spell as a Glasgow MP and his exploiting disillusion with the Labour Government. It predicted that the result would "give the Unionist and Conservative  party organisations the sort of stimulus they need in their efforts to drive the Government from power and office."

References

1950 in Scotland
1950s elections in Scotland
1950 elections in the United Kingdom
Scotston
1950s in Glasgow